Casey, Crime Photographer (aka Crime photographer; Flashgun Casey; Casey, Press Photographer; Stephen Bristol, Crime Photographer) was a media franchise, in the 1930s until the 1960s. Created by George Harmon Coxe, the photographer Casey was featured in radio, film, theater, novels, magazines and comic books, and television.
Launched in a 1934 issue of the pulp magazine Black Mask, the character Jack "Flashgun" Casey, was a crime photographer for the newspaper The Morning Express. With the help of reporter Ann Williams (portrayed on radio and TV by Jan Miner), he solved crimes and recounted his stories to friends at The Blue Note, their favorite tavern.

George Harmon Coxe 

Casey's creator, George Harmon Coxe, was the 1964 recipient of the Mystery Writers of America's prestigious Grand Master Award representing the pinnacle of achievement in the mystery field. This award represents significant output of quality in mystery writing.

Black Mask 

 "Flashgun" Casey began in the March 1934 issue of Black Mask, in the story Return Engagement. This story was later used in the film "Here's Flash Casey". Twenty more stories appeared in the magazine over the next decades, and collections of these stories were published in anthology form as well. Two of the subsequent novels were serialized in the magazine, in addition to the 21 short stories.

In 1941, three parts of the early novels; Silent are the Dead were published in Black Mask in September, October and November as Killers Are Camera Shy; and in 1943, Murder for Two was serialized in January, February and March as Blood on the Lens.

Novels 
Coxe wrote five novels featuring Casey.
 Deadly Image (1964)
 Error of Judgement (1961)
 The Man Who Died Too Soon (1962)
 Murder For Two (1943)
 serialized in Black Mask over three issues.
 Silent Are the Dead (1942)
 serialized in Black Mask over three issues.
Paul Ayres (Pseudonym of Edward S. Aaron) wrote a novel starring Casey, based on the works of Coxe
 Dead Heat (1950)

Films 

 Women Are Trouble (1936)
 Here's Flash Casey (1938)

Radio 

Begun as stories in Black Mask, the stories were brought to radio under multiple names.  The series aired on CBS for its entirety. 07/07/43 - 11/16/50 and 01/13/54 - 04/22/55.

 Selected cast
 Matt Crowley, Casey
 Staats Cotsworth, Casey
 Jan Miner, Ann Williams
 John Gibson, Ethelbert
 Titles of show
 Flashgun Casey
 Casey, Crime Photographer
 Casey, Press Photographer
 Crime Photographer

The radio show was sustained by the network, sponsored by Anchor Hocking, Toni home permanents, Toni Shampoo and Philip Morris. The Blue Note was a jazz club; the Archie Bleyer Orchestra and first Herman Chittison and later The Teddy Wilson Trio were featured, usually in the introduction and wrap up of the show.

Comic books 
Marvel Comics predecessor Timely Comics published four issues of a comic book tie-in to the radio show. The series began in August 1949 and ended in February 1950. Art was provided by regular Timely artist Vernon Henkel.

Television 

In 1951 the popular series moved to television
 First Telecast: April 19, 1951
 Last Telecast: June 5, 1952
 Cast
 Jack "Flashgun" Casey (June 1951-April 1952): Darren McGavin
 Ann Williams: Jan Miner (reprising her role on radio)

On Darren McGavin's website, he is quoted as saying "The cast of Crime Photographer didn’t go down fighting. "They took off for the hills. It was so bad that it was never re-run, and that’s saying something when you recall the caliber of television programs in those days."

References 

Mass media franchises introduced in 1934
1951 American television series debuts
1952 American television series endings
CBS original programming
Crime fiction
American crime television series
Television shows based on American novels
Edgar Award-winning works